Stresemann is a 1957 West German drama film directed by Alfred Braun and starring Ernst Schroder, Leonard Steckel and Anouk Aimée. It portrays the career of the German Minister for Foreign Affairs Gustav Stresemann in the 1920s.

The film's art direction was by Otto Erdmann and Wilhelm Vorwerg.

Cast
 Ernst Schröder as Dr. Gustav Stresemann
 Leonard Steckel as Aristide Briand
 Anouk Aimée as Annette Stein
 Wolfgang Preiss as Heinz Becker
 Susanne von Almassy as Käte Stresemann
 Jürgen Wölffer as Wolfgang Stresemann
 Wolf Harnisch as Bernhard, Stresemann's secretary
 Siegfried Schürenberg as Lord d'Abernon
 Paul Dahlke as President Friedrich Ebert
 Wolfgang Kühne as Haguenin
 Paul Wagner as Winkelmann
 Ernst Stahl-Nachbaur as Stresemann's Doctor
 Erwin Kalser as Raymond Poincaré
 O.A. Buck as Hesnard
 Fritz Eberth
 Hans Emons
 Gerhard Haselbach as Löbe
 Rolf Kestin
 Tilly Lauenstein
 Stanislav Ledinek as Monsieur Leger
 Artur Malkowsky as Hindenburg
 Otto Matthies
 Erich Poremski as Von Schubert
 Horst Rienitz
 Siegmar Schneider as Sir Austen Chamberlain
 Walter Tappe
 Otz Tollen as Gen. von Seeckt
 Alexa von Porembsky as Mme. Leger
 Herbert Wilk as Dr. Breitscheid

References

Bibliography

External links

1957 films
1950s biographical drama films
German biographical drama films
West German films
1950s German-language films
Films directed by Alfred Braun
Biographical films about politicians
Films about Nobel laureates
Films set in the 1920s
Cultural depictions of Paul von Hindenburg
Cultural depictions of politicians
Cultural depictions of German men
UFA GmbH films
1957 drama films
1950s German films